Kurt Vangompel (20 September 1973 – 17 May 1995) was a Belgian footballer.

Club career
Vangompel started his career at Bocholt, and played for Lommel and KV Mechelen before joining Antwerp.

Deaths
A talented striker who played for the Belgium U-21's, Vangompel died in a car accident alongside his cousin, aged only 21.

References 

1973 births
1995 deaths
People from Bree, Belgium
Association football forwards
Belgian footballers
K.V. Mechelen players
Royal Antwerp F.C. players
Road incident deaths in Belgium
K.F.C. Lommel S.K. players
Association football goalkeepers
Footballers from Limburg (Belgium)